The S4 is a railway service of the St. Gallen S-Bahn that provides hourly service over a circular route that includes , , and , in the canton of St. Gallen. Südostbahn, a private company primarily owned by the federal government and the canton, operates the service.

Operations 

The S4 operates hourly in both a clockwise and counter-clockwise direction. A full journey around the circle takes approximately three hours. In , which lies to the west of the junction between the Uznach–Wattwil and Rapperswil–Ziegelbrücke lines, the trains reverse their direction of travel.  The S4 circle line is sometimes referred to as the 'Alpstein round trip' (Alpsteinrundfahrt). The service is operated by Stadler Rail Flirt/Flirt-3 EMUs of Südostbahn (SOB). 

Service between St. Gallen and St. Margrethen is more frequent due to the additional S5 (St. Gallen S-Bahn), which runs hourly.

Route 

  –  –  (inversion of direction) – St. Gallen (operates in both directions)

In clockwise direction:

 St. Gallen
 
 
 
 
 
 
 
 
 
 
 
 
 
 
 
 Buchs SG
 
 
 
 
 
 
 
 
 
 
 Uznach
 
 
 
  (stops only on request)
  (stops only on request)
 
  (stops only on request)
 
 
 St. Gallen

History 
Service southeast of St. Gallen toward Sargans was handled by various local services, but only the  operated over the whole route.

References

External links 
 2018 brochure

St. Gallen S-Bahn lines
Transport in the canton of St. Gallen